Butch Minds the Baby is a 1942 American comedy film directed by Albert S. Rogell and written by Leonard Spigelgass, based on the short story of the same name by Damon Runyon. The film stars Virginia Bruce, Broderick Crawford, Dick Foran, Porter Hall, Richard Lane and Shemp Howard. The film was released on March 20, 1942, by Universal Pictures.

Plot
Aloysius 'Butch' Grogan is known for being involved with crime. He is motivated to continue being a criminal, in order to provide Susie O'Neill with the money so she can support herself and raise her son. Butch joins a gang of safe crackers as a lookout, but one of them brings his baby son along with him on the job. Butch has to keep the baby on his mind while the safe is being knocked over.

Cast        
Virginia Bruce as Susie O'Neill
Broderick Crawford as Aloysius 'Butch' Grogan
Dick Foran as Dennis Devlin
Porter Hall as Brandy Smith
Richard Lane as Harry the Horse
Shemp Howard as Blinky Sweeney
Rosina Galli as Mrs. Talucci
Joe King as Police Lieutenant
Fuzzy Knight as Wyoming Bill
Frank Moran as Jack the Beefer
Grant Withers as Cactus Pete
Russell Hicks as J. Wadsworth Carrington
Tom Kennedy as Philly the Weeper
Eddie Foster as Hot Horse Herbie
Jimmy O'Gatty as Spanish John
Pat McKee as Nathan Detroit
Lou Lubin as Acey Deucey
Charles Sullivan as Big Nig
Spider McCoy as Henchman
Al Bain as Henchman 
H. Michael Barnitz as The Baby

References

External links
 

1942 films
1940s English-language films
American comedy films
1942 comedy films
Universal Pictures films
Films directed by Albert S. Rogell
American black-and-white films
1940s American films